Crasnîi may refer to the following places in Transnistria, Moldova:

Crasnîi Octeabri
Crasnîi Vinogradari